German submarine U-95 was a Type VIIC U-boat of Nazi Germany's Kriegsmarine during World War II. She was laid down on 16 September 1939 by Germaniawerft at Kiel as yard number 600 and commissioned on 31 August 1940.

U-95 was sunk by a torpedo from the Dutch submarine  on 28 November 1941 in the Mediterranean Sea.

Design
German Type VIIC submarines were preceded by the shorter Type VIIB submarines. U-95 had a displacement of  when at the surface and  while submerged. She had two shafts and two  propellers.

U-95 was fitted with five  torpedo tubes (four fitted at the bow and one at the stern), fourteen torpedoes, one  SK C/35 naval gun, 220 rounds, and a  C/30 anti-aircraft gun. The boat had a complement of between forty-four and sixty.

Service history
U-95 was a member of two wolfpacks.

First patrol
The boat left Kiel for her first patrol on 20 November 1940. She entered the Northern Atlantic Ocean and damaged Ringhorn on the 28th with her deck gun, having missed with two torpedoes. The merchantman was hit in the funnel and near the bridge, but the action could not be brought to a successful conclusion because of weather conditions. The Germans, believing the ship would sink, left the area but the crew re-boarded her and sailed to Belfast Lough.

U-95 also damaged Conch on 2 December. The boat fired four torpedoes, one of which struck the vessel.

The submarine headed for her new French Atlantic base, arriving at Lorient on 6 December.

Second patrol
This vessel met her end due to the actions of U-99 on the 27th.

Third patrol
The boat left Lorient on 16 February 1941 for her third sortie. She sank Cape Nelson and Temple Moat south of Iceland on the 24th.

When Pacific went down on 2 March north of Rockall, there was only one survivor. The destruction of the neutral Murjek was even more bloody. She went to the bottom with all hands on the fifth.

U-95 returned to France, but to St. Nazaire on 19 March.

Fourth patrol
1930 Built as TARANGER at Burmeister & Wains Maskin- & Skibsbyggeri, København, Danmark for Westfal-Larsen & Co. A/S, Bergen. Launched 12/02, delivered in April.
torpedoed and sunk 03/05 by the German submarine U-95 (Kapitänleutnant Gerd Schreiber) abt. 150 nm South West of Reykjavik, Iceland whilst on a voyage from Liverpool, England via Panama to Vancouver, BC, Canada in ballast.
1 man died. 31 survivors.  https://skipshistorie.net/Tramp%20og%20linje/Tekster/LTK00119300400000%20TARANGER.htm

Fifth patrol
For her fifth patrol, U-95 damaged Palma west southwest of Bantry Bay (Ireland) on 20 July 1941. One hit with her deck gun was reported when three rounds had struck their target.

Sixth patrol
U-95s only kill on her sixth foray was Trinidad. The relatively small ship was sunk with 37 rounds from the boat's deck gun due west of La Rochelle on 6 September 1941.

Seventh patrol and loss
The submarine successfully forced the heavily defended Strait of Gibraltar and entered the Mediterranean Sea.

35 men died with the U-boat; there were 12 survivors.

Wolfpacks
U-95 took part in two wolfpacks, namely:
 Bosemüller (28 August - 2 September 1941) 
 Seewolf (2 – 14 September 1941)

Summary of raiding history

See also
 Mediterranean U-boat Campaign (World War II)

References

Bibliography

External links

German Type VIIC submarines
U-boats commissioned in 1940
U-boats sunk in 1941
U-boats sunk by Dutch submarines
World War II submarines of Germany
World War II shipwrecks in the Mediterranean Sea
1940 ships
Ships built in Kiel
Maritime incidents in November 1941